Beatrice Daly (born 15 April 1981) is an Australian former volleyball player. She was part of the Australia women's national volleyball team.

She competed with the national team at the 2000 Summer Olympics in Sydney, Australia, finishing 9th.

See also
 Australia at the 2000 Summer Olympics

References

External links
 
Corporate Olympics

1981 births
Living people
Australian women's volleyball players
Sportspeople from Adelaide
Volleyball players at the 2000 Summer Olympics
Olympic volleyball players of Australia